The women's 500 meter at the 2020 KNSB Dutch Single Distance Championships in Heerenveen took place at Thialf ice skating rink on Saturday 28 December 2019.

Statistics

Result

Source:

Referee: Frank Zwitser Assistant: Suzan van den Belt  Starter: André de Vries 
Start: 15:25 hr. Finish: 15:44 hr.

Draw

References 

Single Distance Championships
2020 Single Distance
World